Henri Coiffier de Ruzé, Marquis of Cinq-Mars (1620 – 12 September 1642) was a favourite of King Louis XIII of France, who led the last and most nearly successful of many conspiracies against the Cardinal Richelieu, the king's powerful first minister.

Life
Cinq-Mars was the son of Marshal Antoine Coiffier de Ruzé, marquis d'Effiat, a close friend of Cardinal Richelieu, who took the boy under his protection on his father's death in 1632.

Career 
As the son of the marquis d'Effiat, a famous Superintendent of Finances who was also a good friend of Richelieu's, Cinq-Mars came to court very early.

In 1639, after the exile of the royal favourite Marie de Hautefort, Richelieu introduced the young Cinq-Mars to Louis, hoping he would find favour with the king, thus allowing Richelieu to exercise even greater control over the king. Cinq-Mars indeed quickly established himself as a royal favourite, and was raised to Grand Squire of France. The cardinal believed he could easily control Cinq-Mars, but instead Cinq-Mars pressed the king for important favours and tried to convince the king to have Richelieu executed. 

In 1641, Cinq-Mars was active in the Comte de Soissons' rebellion, but the effort failed. The next year, he conspired again with the king's brother, Gaston, Duke of Orleans, to try to get support for the rebellion from Philip IV, the king of Spain; Richelieu's spy service caught him doing so.  

Consequently, Richelieu had Cinq-Mars imprisoned and beheaded in the Place des Terreaux in Lyon, along with his accomplice, François Auguste de Thou. The French writer, Tallemant, relates that the king showed no emotions concerning the execution: he said "Je voudrais bien voir la grimace qu'il fait à cette heure sur cet échafaud" ('I would like to see the grimace he is now making on this scaffold'). The Marquis of Cinq-Mars' last words were, "Mon Dieu! Qu’est-ce que ce monde" ('My God! What is this world?').

Miscellaneous
Alfred de Vigny wrote a novel Cinq-Mars, inspired by the story of the marquis,  and published in 1826. Charles Gounod wrote an opera of the same name which premiered on April 5, 1877. Barbara Strozzi composed a cantata about the execution of the marquis ("Il lamento sul Rodano severo").

A famous historical painting by Paul Delaroche shows Cardinal Richelieu in a gorgeous barge, preceding the boat carrying Cinq-Mars and De Thou to their execution.

Historical accounts are Jeanne-Pauline Basserie, La conjuration de Cinq-Mars (Paris, 1896) and  Anaïs Bazin, Histoire de France sous Louis XIII (Paris).

Footnotes

External links
 
 Historiettes (in 17th century French)
 Detailed history: Conspiration et mort de Cinq-Mars (in French)

1620 births
1642 deaths
Coiffier de Ruze, Henri
Grand Squires of France
Executed French people
People executed by France by decapitation
French royal favourites
LGBT nobility
17th-century executions by France
Male lovers of royalty
17th-century LGBT people
Court of Louis XIII